Rula Jebreal (born April 24, 1973) is a Palestinian foreign policy analyst, journalist, novelist and screenwriter with dual Israeli and Italian citizenship. She was a commentator for MSNBC.

Early life and education
Jebreal was born in Haifa, Israel, to Nigeria-born Sufi imam Othman Jebreal and Zakia, and grew up in Jerusalem. Her father was an imam and groundskeeper at the Al-Aqsa Mosque. Her mother, who suffered from severe abuse in her childhood, committed suicide by walking into the sea and drowning when Jebreal was 5. She and her sister Rania were put into the Dar El-Tifel orphanage by their father, in 1978, until 1991. She was raised in the orphanage, and regards its founder, Hind Husseini, as her teacher and mother, crediting her with saving her life.

In 1993, she received a scholarship from the Italian government to study at the University of Bologna, where she graduated with a degree in physiotherapy.

Career

Journalism
Jebreal worked as a journalist in Italy for twelve years. In 2006 she worked with Michele Santoro as an interviewer on AnnoZero, a political television show in Italy.

Books and films

Jebreal first novel Miral was published in 2003. The film version, adapted by Jebreal, and directed by Julian Schnabel, was first released in 2010.

Jebreal's second novel The Bride of Aswan was published in 2007. Her third book, Rejected, is a non-fiction study based  on interviews with immigrants who have either made their way to  successful careers in Italy or otherwise live on the margins of Italian society.

Personal life
She has a daughter Miral whose father is artist Davide Rivalta.

Her collaboration with Julian Schnabel on Miral, extended beyond the movie. Jebreal was in a relationship with him from 2007 to 2011.

In 2013, she married Arthur Altschul, Jr., son of banker Arthur Goodhart Altschul Sr. and a member of the Lehman family. She divorced Altschul in 2016 and started dating Roger Waters, founder of Pink Floyd. 

She is fluent in four languages: Arabic, Hebrew, English and Italian. She describes herself as a "secular Muslim".

Works
La strada dei fiori di Miral, BUR Biblioteca Univ. Rizzoli, 2005, 

Ørkenblomsten, Engelstad forl., 2005, 
Miral – Ein Land. Drei Frauen. Ein gemeinsamer Traum, Translated Leon Mengden, Btb, 2010, 
La sposa di Assuan, (Bride of Aswan) Rizzoli, 2005, 
La promise d'Assouan, Translated Lucie Comparini, Altal éd., 2007, 
A esposa de Assuão,  Campo das Letras, 2007, 
Divieto di soggiorno: l'Italia vista con gli occhi dei suoi immigrati, (Rejected) Milan, Italy: Rizzoli, 2007,

References

External links

Rula Jebreal on C-SPAN

"Rula Jebreal", collected articles at Radyoheval (Italian)

1973 births
Living people
Palestinian television personalities
People from Jerusalem
American Muslims
Palestinian novelists
Israeli people of Nigerian descent
Palestinian people of Nigerian descent
Arab citizens of Israel
University of Bologna alumni
People from Haifa
Lehman family
Palestinian broadcasters
Italian people of Israeli descent
Italian people of Palestinian descent